The Estonian Physical Society (Eesti Füüsika Selts, EFS) is a voluntary not-for-profit research society bringing together all those active in physics in Estonia. The EFS was established in 1989 and is affiliated with the Estonian Academy of Sciences (Eesti Teaduste Akadeemia) and is a European Physical Society Member Society.

Presidents of the Estonian Physical Society

Kaido Reivelt (University of Tartu) is the current president (since 2007). 
The first president of the Society was Jaak Aaviksoo, followed later by Piret Kuusk (1998-2001), Raivo Jaaniso (2001-2004), and Arvo Kikas (2004-2007).

Honorary members 
 Henn Käämbre
 Karl Rebane
 Harald Keres
 Jaan Einasto
 Piret Kuusk

Awards
The society gives several awards:
Annual Award:  in recognition of theoretical, experimental, or an area of physics research results. The award is published in the Annals of the Estonian Physical Society;
A certificate of honor status: for promoting physics in Estonia;
Two student awards for research and for the promotion of physics.

Publications
 Annals of the Estonian Physical Society

References

External links
 
 Fyysika.ee – Estonian physics portal created by the EFS
 Teadusbuss – Science Bus, a science popularization project led by the EFS

Physics societies
Scientific organizations based in Estonia
Scientific organizations established in 1989
1989 establishments in Estonia
Science and technology in Estonia